Parque Lenin (English: Lenin Park) is a recreational park complex situated south of Havana, Cuba.

Overview
There is a monument to Lenin by Soviet realist sculptor Lev Kerbel and a plaque that says (in Fidel Castro's own words) "Lenin fue desde el primer instante, no solo un teórico de la política, sino un hombre de acción, un hombre de practica revolucionaria constante e incesante" (which translates "Lenin was from the first moment, not only a political theorist, but a man of action, a man of constant and incessant revolutionary practice").

See also 
 Ferrocarril Recreacional  (Closed) (located in Parque Lenin)

References

Parks in Cuba